Tedens is a ghost town in Downers Grove Township, DuPage County, Illinois, United States.

Notes

Ghost towns in Illinois
Geography of DuPage County, Illinois